The Ariège is a 163 km long river in southern France, a right tributary of the Garonne. Its source is in the Pyrenees, near El Pas de la Casa, where it forms part of the border with Andorra. It flows north through the following towns in two departments:
 In Ariège: Ax-les-Thermes, Les Cabannes, Tarascon-sur-Ariège, Montgailhard, Foix, Varilhes, Pamiers, Saverdun.
 In Haute-Garonne: Cintegabelle, Auterive, Pinsaguel.

Its longest tributaries are the Hers-Vif and the Lèze. It flows into the Garonne in Portet-sur-Garonne, south of Toulouse. Taken literally, the Latin origin of the river's name, Aurigera, indicates it to be a source of gold.

References

External links
History and real-time water heights of Ariege river, Garonne river, and other tributaries

Rivers of France
Rivers of Andorra
International rivers of Europe
Rivers of Ariège (department)
Rivers of Haute-Garonne
Andorra–France border
Rivers of Occitania (administrative region)
Border rivers